Sironia is a drama film directed by Brandon Dickerson and starring  Amy Acker, Wes Cunningham, Tony Hale, Robyn Lively, Carrie Preston and Meaghan Martin. It was shot on location in Waco, Texas and Los Angeles, California.

Plot

Inspired by the music of singer-songwriter Wes Cunningham, Sironia is the story of a talented musician who has been chewed up and spit out by the Hollywood music machine. Frustrated by his broken career, Thomas Fisher and his wife Molly impulsively pack up and move to small town Sironia, Texas to live a more authentic life and raise their first child near Molly's brother and his family. Despite the change of scenery, Thomas's deep resentment over his lost dreams gets the best of him as he struggles to find peace with his stalled career, until he remembers what he loved about music - and Molly - in the first place.

Cast 
 Amy Acker as Molly Fisher
 Carrie Preston as Grace
 Robyn Lively as Barbara
 Tony Hale as Chad
 Jeremy Sisto as Tucker
 Meaghan Martin as Aubrey
 Wes Cunningham as Thomas Fisher
 Ryan Cartwright as Nick
 John Billingsley as Doug
 Courtney Ford as Amanda
 Ryan Eggold as Mason Jones
 Elaine Tan as Danica

Release
Sironia premiered at the 2011 Austin Film Festival in Austin, Texas in October 2011.

Awards
 Audience Award Winner, 2011 Austin Film Festival Festival

References

External links
 
 
 
 Slackerwood.com review

2011 films
American drama films
American independent films
2010s English-language films
2010s American films